Carlos Enrique Ortiz Rivera (born September 19, 1989), known professionally as Chris Jedi or Chris Jeday, is a Puerto Rican record producer. He is recognized for working with artists such as Daddy Yankee, Don Omar, Wisin & Yandel, Ozuna, De La Ghetto, Anuel AA, Cardi B among others. He has won Billboard Latin Music Awards for producer of the year in 2019.

Early life 
Carlos Enrique Ortiz Rivera was born on September 19, 1989, in the city of San Juan, Puerto Rico. At age 15, he became a singer before becoming a producer. His first opportunities as a producer were thanks to Luny Tunes, whom he respects and admires.

Career 
Jedi has worked as a producer, songwriter and musical engineer alongside the producer and composer O'Neill for Zion & Lennox's "Si Fuera por Mí" on the album Los Verdaderos.

In 2012, he worked on the composition and production of 9 songs from the Wisin & Yandel album Líderes. One of the songs was "Algo Me Gusta de Ti".

Jedi released his first single in 2016, an electronic and reggaeton song titled "Dale Hasta Abajo" featuring singer-songwriter Joey Montana. The following year, he achieved recognition with the song "Ahora Dice", a song that featured the voices of J Balvin, Ozuna and Arcángel. "Ahora Dice" reached number seven on the Hot Latin Songs chart. The music video for the song has received more than 1 billion views on YouTube. The remix version included the participation of Cardi B.

He has worked as a producer on songs such as Daddy Yankee's "La Rompe Corazones" with Ozuna; "Caile" by Zion, De La Ghetto, Bryant Myers and Bad Bunny; "Vaivén" by Daddy Yankee, "La Fórmula" by De La Ghetto, Daddy Yankee, Ozuna, "Vaina Loca" by Ozuna and Manuel Turizo, among others.

In addition, he was the producer of all the songs on Anuel's album Real Hasta la Muerte along with Gaby Music and Frabián Elí. In collaboration with Gaby Music, he has supported the career of Lunay, who published his first studio album, Épico, months after his debut.

In March 2021, along with Gaby Music, Jedi launched La Familia Records. La Familia (meaning the Family) will be home to Lunay as well as newly signed Puerto Rican acts Chanell and Juliito, as well as producers Dímelo Ninow and Dulce como Candy.

Awards
 2019 - Billboard Latin Music Award as Producer of the Year
 Premio Juventud for Producer You Know By 'Shout-out'
 Tu Música Urbano
 ASCAP -  Soltera (remix)

Credits 
 Odisea • Ozuna 2017 Producer - Chris Jedi
 Vibras • J Balvin 2018 Producer / Songwriter - Chris Jedi
 Aura • Ozuna 2018 Producer - Chris Jedi
 "Adictiva" • Daddy Yankee & Anuel AA 2018 Producer / Composer / Lyricist - Chris Jedi
 Ocean • Karol G 2019 Producer - Chris Jedi
 Épico • Lunay 2019 Producer - Chris Jedi
 Real Hasta la Muerte • Anuel AA 2018 Producer - Chris Jedi
 Emmanuel • Anuel AA 2020 Producer - Chris Jedi
 YHLQMDLG • Bad Bunny 2020 Producer - Chris Jedi
 El Último Tour Del Mundo • Bad Bunny
 2020 Producer - Chris Jedi
 LLNM2 • Anuel AA 2018 Producer - Chris Jedi

Discography 
Singles produced
 "Dale Hasta Abajo" (2016)
 "Ahora Dice" (2017)
 "Ella Quiere Beber" (2018)
 "Soltera" (2019)
 "Los de Siempre" (2021)
 "La Llevo al Cielo" (2022)
 "Duro" (2022)

External links 
 La Famila Records

References 

Living people
1989 births
People from San Juan, Puerto Rico
Puerto Rican record producers
Universal Music Latino artists
Latin music songwriters
Reggaeton record producers